Raven's End is a 1963 Swedish drama film directed by Bo Widerberg, about an aspiring working-class writer in Malmö. The story bears some similarities to Widerberg's own background, although he claimed it to be entirely fictional.

Plot
In the mid 1930s, Anders is dreaming about becoming a writer. His friend Sixten is dreaming about becoming a football player so he can go to Paris and meet prostitutes in fur. Anders' ambitions are supported by his girlfriend Elsie and his parents. His mother supports the family by doing laundry, while his father is unemployed and has a problem with alcohol and gambling.

Anders sends a script for a book he has written about the block they live in to a publisher in Stockholm. He is asked to come to Stockholm and discuss the book, which makes his father excited. But the publisher doesn't want to publish the book, and when Anders returns they all become very disappointed.

Elsie becomes pregnant with Anders' child. Anders seeks advice from his father, but the father is drunk and they end up fighting. The father blames his wife for all the misery they are suffering from, meaning it's all because he was humiliated by an affair she once had. The mother blames the father, meaning it was his violent behaviour that caused her infidelity.

Anders decides to leave his family, his pregnant girlfriend and all misery behind. He joins Sixten and they both travel to Stockholm.

Cast
 Thommy Berggren as Anders
 Keve Hjelm as His Father
 Emy Storm as His Mother
 Christina Frambäck as Elsie
 Ingvar Hirdwall as Sixten
 Agneta Prytz as Neighbour
 Fritiof Nilsson Piraten as himself
 Nina Widerberg as Nina

Production
The film was shot on location in a run-down Malmö block that was soon to be demolished. Locals were used as extras to strengthen the feeling of authenticity.

Awards and nominations
At the 1st Guldbagge Awards Keve Hjelm was awarded the Guldbagge for Best Actor. The film was nominated for the Academy Award for Best Foreign Language Film. It was also entered into the official selection at the 1964 Cannes Film Festival, competing for the Palme d'Or.

See also
 List of submissions to the 37th Academy Awards for Best Foreign Language Film
 List of Swedish submissions for the Academy Award for Best Foreign Language Film

References

External links
 
 

1963 films
1960s Swedish-language films
1963 drama films
1960s Swedish films
Swedish drama films
Swedish black-and-white films
Films directed by Bo Widerberg
Films about writers